Sungai Pinang was a state constituency in Selangor, Malaysia, that had been represented in the Selangor State Legislative Assembly since 2004 to 2018.

The state constituency was created in the 2003 redistribution and is mandated to return a single member to the Selangor State Legislative Assembly under the first past the post voting system.

History 
It was abolished in 2004 when it was redistributed.

Representation history

Election results 

}}

References 

 

Defunct Selangor state constituencies
2003 establishments in Malaysia
2018 disestablishments in Malaysia